Half Waif is the stage name of American musician Nandi Rose.

Early life
Rose was born to an Indian mother from Uganda. She grew up in Williamstown, Massachusetts. Her parents divorced when she was a child. Rose began writing music when she was a child in Massachusetts. Rose attended Kenyon College.

History
Rose is a former member of the indie rock band Pinegrove Rose released her first full-length album as Half Waif in 2014 titled Kotekan. Rose followed up that release in 2016 with her second full-length album titled Probable Depths. In 2017, Rose  released an EP titled form/a. Rose released her third full-length album as Half Waif in 2018 titled Lavender. The album received a 7.8 out of 10 rating from Pitchfork. The album was Stereogum's album of the week upon its release.

In April 2021, Rose announced her fifth album Mythopoetics with a July 9 release date.

Rose's music has been described as synth-pop and electronic.

Personal life
Rose is married to Pinegrove member Zack Levine.

Discography
Studio albums
Kotekan (2014)
Probable Depths (2016)
Lavender (2018)
The Caretaker (2020)
Mythopoetics (2021)
EPs
form/a (2017)

References

Year of birth missing (living people)
Living people
American women singer-songwriters
American synth-pop musicians
American rock keyboardists
Cascine artists
Anti- (record label) artists
American singer-songwriters
21st-century American women